is a railway station in the city of Chita, Aichi, Japan, operated by Meitetsu.

Lines

Station layout
The station has dual opposed elevated  side platforms with the station building located underneath. The station is staffed.

Platforms

Adjacent stations

Station history
Asakura Station was opened on May 9, 1923, as a station on the Aichi Electric Railway Company. The Aichi Electric Railway became part of the Meitetsu group on August 1, 1935. The station building was reconstructed in March 1982, when the tracks were elevated. The station has been unattended since December 2004. In January 2005, the Tranpass system of magnetic fare cards with automatic turnstiles was implemented, and the station has been unattended since that point.

Passenger statistics
In fiscal 2017, the station was used by an average of 7,537 passengers daily (boarding passengers only).

Surrounding area
Chita City Hall

See also
 List of Railway Stations in Japan

References

External links

 Official web page 

Railway stations in Japan opened in 1923
Railway stations in Aichi Prefecture
Stations of Nagoya Railroad
Chita, Aichi